Percy & Hamilton was an architectural firm in San Francisco, California during 1880 to 1899. 

The firm was a partnership of George Washington Percy (1847–1900) and Frederick Foss Hamilton (1851–1899). During the period of 1890 to 1900, they designed numerous residences and churches in the Pacific Heights area. Many of their works were destroyed in the 1906 earthquake; others were destroyed for redevelopment. Several of their works survive and are listed on the National Register of Historic Places.

Architectural works
Select list of architectural works, in order by date. 
Charles Heise House (1884), at 2517 Pacific Avenue, San Francisco
Greystone Cellars (1886), 2555 Main Street, St. Helena, CA, NRHP-listed
Sharon Building (1887), in Golden Gate Park, San Francisco
First Unitarian Church (1889), at 1187 Franklin Street, San Francisco Landmark #40
Frederick Hamilton House (1890), at 2513 Pacific Avenue
J. C. Stubbs House (1892), at 2519 Pacific Avenue
Trinity Presbyterian Church (1892), 3261–23rd Street, San Francisco, CA, NRHP-listed
Alameda City Hall (1896), Santa Clara Avenue and Oak Street, Alameda, CA, NRHP-listed
Alvinza Hayward Building (1906), 400 Montgomery Street, San Francisco, CA, San Francisco Landmark #161; after Hamilton's death, Percy worked briefly with Willis Polk; this partnership designed the Alvinza Hayward Building, located in the financial district.

See also 

 List of San Francisco Designated Landmarks

References

19th-century American architects
Architecture firms of the United States
Architects from California
Defunct architecture firms based in California